Dadaşbəyli (also, Dadashbeyli) is a village and municipality in the Sabirabad Rayon of Azerbaijan.  It has a population of 677.

References 

Populated places in Sabirabad District